Peter Andreas Amundsen Morell (1 January 1868 – 30 January 1948) was  a Norwegian farmer and politician.

Peter  Morell was born in Aker (now  Akershus), Norway. He was the son of Ole Amundsen (1827-85) and Johanna Gustava Kjelin (1844-1918). 
Morrell took over the Nedre Grefsen farm which had been purchased by his father in 1855. He later took over the nearby farms Storo (1889)  and Østre Grefsen  (1895) . 

Morell was the mayor of Aker  (1902-1907) and (1911-1916). He was elected to the Storting  between 1903 and 1912. He was the Norwegian Minister of Social Affairs in the government formed by Ivar Lykke  (1926 to 1928).

In 1890, he married  Hanna Astrup (1869-1933), daughter of Harald Astrup. Her brothers included the architects   Henning Astrup (1864–1896) and Thorvald Astrup (1876–1940), Arctic explorer Eivind Astrup (1871–1895) and member of Parliament  Sigurd Astrup (1873–1949).

Peter  Morell established  a foundation  (Hanna og Peter Andreas Morells legat) in support of higher education for residents of Grefsen.

References

External links
 Grefsen a Hundred Years Ago ( Historielaget Grefsen • Kjelsås • Nydalen)  

1868 births
1948 deaths

Government ministers of Norway
Politicians from Aker
Mayors of places in Akershus